The Place Royale ("Royal Square") or Koningsplein ("King's Square") is a historic neoclassical square in the Royal Quarter of Brussels, Belgium. Modelled after the so-called French royal square and built between 1775 and 1782, according to a plan of the architects Jean-Benoît-Vincent Barré and Gilles-Barnabé Guimard, to replace the former Palace of Coudenberg, it was part of an urban project including Brussels Park.

The Place Royale is one of oldest architecturally consistent and monumental public squares, as well as an excellent example of 18th-century urban architecture. Rectangular and symmetrical in shape, it measures , and is entirely paved. In its centre stands an equestrian statue of Godfrey of Bouillon. It is also flanked by the Church of St. James on Coudenberg, as well as some of the main museums in the city.

The / enters the square from the south, the / from the south-west, and the / and the Mont des Arts/Kunstberg from the north-west. This area is served by Brussels Central Station, as well as by the metro stations Parc/Park (on lines 1 and 5) and Trône/Troon (on lines 2 and 6).

History

Early history

The Place Royale was built on the former site of the /, the main market square adjacent to the former Castle and then Palace of Coudenberg, which had served as the residence (and seat of power) of the counts, dukes, archdukes, kings, emperors or governors who, from the 12th century to the 18th century, exerted their sovereignty over the Duchy of Brabant and later over all or part of the Burgundian and then Spanish and Austrian Netherlands. This first square, whose initial enclosure was made of wood (1434), was provided in 1509 with a new stone fence designed by the court architects Antoon I Keldermans and Antoon II Keldermans.

The palace burned down on the night of 3 February 1731 in a fire that took much of the original royal complex. Several projects for the redevelopment of this space were proposed, including the reconstruction of a palace, which did not go beyond the stage of sketches, for lack of money. The construction of a new palace also seemed to be all the less necessary since, in the meantime, the court had moved to the Palace of Orange-Nassau, on the site of today's Palace of Charles of Lorraine. In 1769, the idea germinated to clear and level the ruins of the Place des Bailles and to convert it into an esplanade intended for military parades. The plan was on the verge of completion in 1772, when another project rendered it obsolete.

Clearance and development

It was only in 1774 that Prince Charles Alexander of Lorraine, Governor of the Austrian Netherlands, proposed replacing the ruins with a monumental royal square inspired by French models such as the Place Stanislas in Nancy (1755) and the Place Royale in Reims (1759), of which it is almost an exact replica. The project was approved that same year by Empress Maria Theresa of Austria, who authorised the demolition.

Construction of the new buildings around the square took from 1775 to 1782, using the neoclassical design of the French architects Jean-Benoît-Vincent Barré, who drafted the basic project, and Gilles-Barnabé Guimard, who received that commission in 1769 and who carried out the detailed plans. The first draft of the project, designed by the engineers-architects Louis-Joseph Baudour and  had planned to keep the Gothic chapel of the former palace, which had been spared by the fire. Due to the architectural clash with the surrounding neoclassical buildings, however, it was pulled down. This plan was modified around 1780 by the Austrian landscape architect , who imagined connecting the square to the new Palace of Charles of Lorraine and Brussels Park (housing a statue of Empress Maria Theresa, which was never carried out). The new district, known today as the Royal Quarter, and designed on a structure connecting these three strategic points, also aimed to relieve congestion in this part of the city.

The former statue of Charles Alexander of Lorraine, which stood at the centre of the square, was made by the Flemish sculptor and architect Peter Anton von Verschaffelt. It showed the governor standing, dressed as a Roman general draped in a consular mantle, attending to the affairs of state. French revolutionaries toppled the statue when they entered Brussels in January 1793. Replaced during the brief Austrian restoration, this new statue was also knocked down by the French, who this time melted it down, turned it into coins, and planted a "Liberty tree" on its site. This tree was itself felled in 1814, during the fall of the Napoleonic Empire.

19th and 20th centuries

In the following centuries, official ceremonies and political demonstrations were occasionally held on the square. Cavalcades were organised there in honour of Napoleon in 1810. It is still there that was celebrated the inauguration of William I as ruler of the Netherlands on 21 September 1815. During the Belgian Revolution in 1830, a barricade was erected across the eastern exit of the square next to the current BELvue Museum, facing Brussels Park, with two cannon positioned on it. On 21 July 1831, King Leopold I took the oath as the first King of the Belgians before members of Congress on a platform in front of the Church of St. James on Coudenberg. The funerals of King Leopold III and Prince Charles, prince-regent between 1944 and 1950, also took place on the square.

Remaining empty for several decades, from 1848, the centre of the square was once again occupied by a monument (still present today); an equestrian statue of Godfrey of Bouillon, built at a time when the young Belgian State was in search of patriotic landmarks. The blue stone posts connected by iron chains that originally lined the square disappeared in the middle of the 19th century and were replaced by sidewalks. By the turn of the 20th century, the square increasingly became a hub of intense traffic, first with the addition of a horse-drawn tramway (later electrified), then through the rise of the automobile; the statue having roundabout function, from 1921, for north–south and east–west traffic.

Present day and future

Nowadays, in the north-western corner of the Place Royale lies an archaeological area. Classified as a historical monument, these remains are part of a larger ensemble accessible from the BELvue Museum. Below the square also lies the so-called / ("Isabella Street"), a former street that connected the Palace to the Church of St. Michael and St. Gudula (now Brussels' cathedral). Guimard had the street vaulted as part of the square's construction, with the intention of converting it into cellars. The lower rooms of these buildings also partially survived the fire, and are exposed in the archaeological site.

In 2014, the City of Brussels announced plans to restore the square's buildings and atmosphere, with wider sidewalks, new lighting and better enhancement of the facades. The work was scheduled to start in 2019 and end in 2020. However, the project did not see the light of day. New plans were put forward in 2021 with the public inquiry led by the City, the heritage organisation Beliris, and the Brussels Secretary of State for Urbanism and Heritage, Pascal Smet (one.brussels). If currently, 20% of the Place Royale is devoted to pedestrians and 80% to motorised traffic, the objective of the redevelopment project is to reverse this trend. Most of the square will therefore be on one level and the traffic lanes will be modified. The natural stone sidewalks, dating from the 18th century, will be preserved, as will the lampposts and paving stones already installed. Final plans were put to public consultation in 2021 and work may begin in the future.

Layout
Rectangular and symmetrical in shape (approximately ), the Place Royale follows the neoclassical principles, and is modelled after the so-called French royal square, as developed at the end of the 17th century. Its buildings being burdened with an architectural servitude, it has undergone few changes since its creation in the 18th century; the statue of Godfrey of Bouillon has replaced that of Prince Charles Alexander of Lorraine; and the original colonnade which enclosed it to the south was destroyed during the opening of the / in 1827.

Around the square, one can find many cultural institutions of Brussels; the BELvue Museum, the Royal Museums of Fine Arts of Belgium, the Musical Instruments Museum (MIM) (the entrance of which is through the Old England building), the remains of the former Coudenberg Palace (whose entrance is through the BELvue Museum), and the Magritte Museum. Other major tourist attractions are located within walking distance of the square; Brussels Park, the Royal Palace, and the Cathedral of St. Michael and St. Gudula.

Church of St. James on Coudenberg

The principal building on the square is the neoclassical Church of St. James on Coudenberg, consecrated in 1787, and designed by Gilles-Barnabé Guimard after the designs of Jean-Benoît-Vincent Barré. It succeeds two neighbouring places of worship; the chapel of the Coudenberg Palace and the Coudenberg's abbey church, both demolished by command of Charles Alexander of Lorraine during his expansive urban planning projects, despite having escaped the great fire of 1731 that destroyed the palace. The first stone was solemnly laid by Charles Alexander of Lorraine on 12 February 1776, and the portico was finished in 1780. The nave, transept, choir and sacristy were built under supervision of Louis Montoyer in 1785–86.

During the French Revolution, the abbey was suspended and the church was made into a Temple of Reason, and then later into a Temple of Law. The church was returned to Catholic control in 1802. On 21 July 1831, Prince Leopold of Saxe-Coburg-Gotha took the oath that made him H.M. Leopold I, the first King of the Belgians, on the front steps of the church. The building lost somewhat of its typical neoclassical temple-like appearance by the addition, in the 19th century, of a dome and bell tower (after the design of the architect Tilman-François Suys), as well as a coloured fresco by the painter Jean Portaels on the pediment.

The church's interior and facade have been protected through a royal decree since 2 December 1959.

Statue of Godfrey of Bouillon

At the centre of the square is an equestrian statue of Godfrey of Bouillon, the leader of the first crusade in 1096. The first equestrian statue to adorn Brussels, it was sculpted by Eugène Simonis and inaugurated on 15 August 1848 to replace the statue of Charles Alexander of Lorraine by Peter Anton von Verschaffelt, which had been melted down for the value of the metal during the French rule over Brussels.  A new statue of Charles Alexander of Lorraine was eventually placed nearby on the current /.

The statue represents Godfrey of Bouillon as he leaves for the First Crusade; the hero waves the standard and cries  ("God wills it!"). In 1897, two bronze bas-reliefs by Guillaume de Groot were built into the statue's pedestal. One represents the Assault on Jerusalem led by Godfrey, who took the city on 15 July 1099. The other represents the Assizes of Jerusalem, a collection of laws and ordinances which were never promulgated by him.

Pavilions
The eight corner pavilions, built between 1776 and 1782, represent a remarkable Louis XVI style neoclassical ensemble. Bearing numbers from 1 to 14, they are arranged symmetrically around the square:
 the former Hôtel du Lotto (no. 1–2) was built for the Imperial and Royal Lottery of the Netherlands. Also known as the Hôtel Altenloh after the jeweller's shop that occupied the building from 1920 to 1962, it is currently home to the Magritte Museum, part of the Royal Museums of Fine Arts of Belgium. 
 the former Hôtel des Brasseurs (no. 3) was built by the Corporation of Brewers. It is currently part of the Fin-de-Siècle Museum, another constituent of the Royal Museums. Also known as the Hôtel Gresham (for the wing facing the Place Royale), after the Gresham Life Assurance Society Limited that acquired it in 1900, or the Hôtel d'Argenteau (for the wing along the Rue de la Régence), it has an interesting Art Nouveau interior by the architect .
 the former Hôtel de Templeuve (no. 4), built for Countess Brigitte Scockaert de Tirimont, dowager of Templeuve, on the site of her family's former town house. It was sometimes called the Hôtel Arconati, after the name of its second owner and also the Palace of the Count of Flanders because Prince Philippe, Count of Flanders, brother of King Leopold II, had acquired it in 1866 and lived there for nearly forty years. This building has been occupied by the Court of Audit of Belgium since 1984.
 the two former Hôtels de Coudenberg (no. 5–6 and 7–8) were built by the Abbey of St. James on Coudenberg. The building to the right of St. James' Church is currently occupied by the ING Cultural Centre (formerly the BBL Cultural Centre). The building on the left is occupied by the Constitutional Court of Belgium.
 the former Hôtel Belle-Vue (no. 9) was built by Philippe de Proft to install a luxury hotel. It is currently occupied by the BELvue Museum.
 the former Hôtel de Grimbergen (no. 10) owes its name to Grimbergen Abbey which undertook its construction. It currently belongs to the government of the Brussels-Capital Region. Under the building are the remains of the chapel of the former Coudenberg Palace.
 the former Hôtel de Spangen (no. 11–14) owes its name to the Earl of Spangen for whom it was built. The building at the corner of the square and the / (no. 13–14) is now part of the Musical Instruments Museum (MIM).

Porticoes
At the corners of the square, porticoes provide a link between the pavilions towards the /, the / and the /, the height, arrangement and decoration of which are almost identical to those of the ground floor of the pavilions.

See also

 Place des Martyrs/Martelaarsplein
 Neoclassical architecture in Belgium
 History of Brussels
 Belgium in "the long nineteenth century"

External links
 Eupedia Tourism Article
 Trabel Tourism Article

References

Notes

Bibliography
 
 
 
 
 
 

Squares in Brussels
City of Brussels
Culture in Brussels
Arts in Belgium
Art gallery districts
Neoclassical architecture in Belgium
18th century in Brussels
Establishments in the Austrian Netherlands
1782 establishments in the Holy Roman Empire
1782 establishments in the Habsburg monarchy